Jiří Pelikán may refer to:

Jiří Pelikán (chess player), Czech-Argentine chess master
Jiří Pelikán (politician), Czechoslovakian journalist and politician
Jiří Pelikán (tennis), Czech tennis player